Aroundtown SA (former Aroundtown Property Holdings Plc) is a publicly listed real estate company, registered in Luxembourg. It invests in commercial and residential properties in central locations in European cities primarily in Germany and the Netherlands.

Company 
Aroundtown invests in commercial and residential real estate. The commercial properties are held by Aroundtown, and in addition Aroundtown holds a substantial interest (40%) in Grand City Properties S.A. ("GCP"), a publicly traded real estate company that focuses on investing  predominantly in the German residential real estate market.

The company's total asset value is €32 billion, total equity value is €17 billion and funds from operations (FFO1) guidance for 2020 calendar year is above €500 million. The net profit in 2019 was €1.7 billion.
The current global rating is BBB+ by S&P. This credit rating is due to the business profile and the conservative financial policy with loan-to-value (LTV) of 34%.

Over the last 5 years the company has raised over €20 billion in equity and bonds between 2015–2020, working with global banks such as JPM, BAML, DB, GS, MS, Citibank, UBS, SocGen, Nomura, Santander, Barcleys, CS, HSBC, RBC and others.

The majority of the portfolio is located in the cities of Berlin (25%), Frankfurt, Munich, Cologne, Hamburg, Amsterdam, London and other major European metropolitans. Approximately half of the portfolio is offices, the remaining is primarily hotels and residential (through 40% holdings in Grand City Properties). Aroundtown owns over 170 hotels, mainly in Germany and other major European metropolitans. The company owns hotels such as Hiltons in Berlin/London/Dublin/Edinburgh, Interconti Frankfurt, Sheraton Rome, Marriot Paris, Crown Plaza Berlin and Mercure Munich.

History 
The Group's business activity was founded in 2004 by Yakir Gabay, who is 10% shareholder. The first acquisitions started in the center of Berlin, in neighbourhoods such as Mitte and Charlottenburg.

The company's stock was listed on the Euronext Stock Exchange in mid 2015 at a price per share of €3.2 and market cap of €1.5 billion. As of mid 2018, the company is listed on the Frankfurt Prime Standard and is included in the MDAX index. The company trades with at ticker "AT1" and has a full market cap of around €10 billion.

Management 
Aroundtown is managed by the management board, and is led by the Co-CEO Barak Barchen, head of capital markets Oschrie Massachi, Chief Development Officer Klaus Krägel and CFO Eyal Ben David.
The chairman of the advisory board is Gerhard Cromme, who served in past positions as the chairman of Siemens and ThyssenKrupp, as well as member on the boards of Lufthansa, Allianz, BNP Paribas, E.ON, Volkswagen and Axel Springer.

References 

Real estate companies of Luxembourg
Real estate companies established in 2004
Financial services companies established in 2004
Luxembourgian companies established in 2004
Companies in the MDAX